
Sokółka County is a unit of territorial administration and local government (powiat) in Podlaskie Voivodeship, north-eastern Poland, on the border with Belarus. It was created on 1 January 1999 as a result of the Polish local government reforms passed in 1998.

As of 2019 its total population is 67,055, out of which the population of Sokółka is 18,134, that of Dąbrowa Białostocka is 5,520, that of Krynki is 2,405, that of Suchowola is 2,183, and the rural population is 38,813.

Neighbouring counties
Sokółka County is bordered by Białystok County to the south-west, Mońki County to the west and Augustów County to the north-west. It also borders Belarus to the east.

Administrative division
The county is subdivided into 10 gminas (four urban-rural and six rural). These are listed in the following table, in descending order of population.

Notable residents 

Jazep Varonka (1891, Kuźnica village – 1952), Belarusian politician, first Chairman of the Belarusian Democratic Republic

References

 
Land counties of Podlaskie Voivodeship